Celebrity Big Brother 1 may refer to:

 Celebrity Big Brother 1 (UK), the 2001 UK series of Celebrity Big Brother
 Celebrity Big Brother 1 (American season), the 2018 U.S. season of Celebrity Big Brother
 Celebrity Big Brother Australia, the 2002 celebrity edition of Big Brother Australia
 Celebrity Big Brother (Croatian TV series), the 2008 Croatian series of Celebrity Big Brother
 Celebrity Big Brother (South African TV series), the 2002 South African series of Celebrity Big Brother
 Big Brother Famosos 1, the 2002 series of Big Brother Famosos, the version of Celebrity Big Brother in Portugal
 Big Brother VIP, the upcoming 2019 celebrity edition of Big Brother in Albania and Kosovo
 Big Brother V.I.P., the 2003 celebrity edition of Big Brother in Denmark
 Big Brother VIP, the 2003 celebrity edition of Big Brother in Hungary
 Big Brother VIP 1, the 2002 celebrity edition of Big Brother in Mexico
 Big Brother VIP, the 2008 celebrity edition of Big Brother in Poland
 Big Brother VIPs, the 2001 celebrity edition of Big Brother in Belgium
 Big Brother VIPs, the 2000 celebrity edition of Big Brother in the Netherlands
 Big Brother Slavnih, the 2010 celebrity edition of Big Brother in Slovenia
 Bigg Boss (India): 
 Bigg Boss (Hindi season 1), the 2006-2007 Hindi season of Bigg Boss, the Indian version of Big Brother 
 Bigg Boss Kannada 1, the 2013 Kannada season of Bigg Boss, the Indian version of Big Brother
 Bigg Boss Bangla 1, the 2013 Bengali season of Bigg Boss, the Indian version of Big Brother
 Bigg Boss Tamil 1, the 2017 Tamil season of Bigg Boss, the Indian version of Big Brother
 Bigg Boss Telugu 1, the 2017 Telugu season of Bigg Boss, the Indian version of Big Brother
 Bigg Boss Marathi 1, the 2018 Marathi season of Bigg Boss, the Indian version of Big Brother
 Bigg Boss Malayalam 1, the 2018 Malayalam season of Bigg Boss, the Indian version of Big Brother
 Gran Hermano Famosos, the 2007 celebrity edition of Gran Hermano, the version of Big Brother in Argentina
 Gran Hermano VIP 1, the 2005 VIP edition of Gran Hermano, the version of Big Brother in Spain
 Grande Fratello VIP 1, the 2017 VIP edition of Grande Fratello, the version of Big Brother in Italy
 HaAh HaGadol VIP 1, the 2009 VIP edition of HaAh HaGadol, the Israeli version of Big Brother
 Julkkis Big Brother, the 2013 celebrity edition of Big Brother in Finland
 Pinoy Big Brother: Celebrity Edition, the 2006 celebrity season of Big Brother in the Philippines
 Promi Big Brother 1, the 2013 celebrity season of Big Brother in Germany
 Veliki brat VIP 1, the 2007 celebrity season of Veliki brat, the version of Big Brother in Serbia, Macedonia, and Bosnia and Herzegovina
 VIP Brother 1, the 2006 edition of Big Brother VIP in Bulgaria

See also 
 Celebrity Big Brother